Anita Corl Huntsman (born May 14, 1951 in Bryn Mawr, Pennsylvania) is a former field hockey player from the United States, who was a member of the Women's National Team that won the bronze medal at the 1984 Summer Olympics in Los Angeles, California. She had previously qualified for the 1980 Olympic team but did not compete due to the Olympic Committee's boycott of the 1980 Summer Olympics in Moscow, Russia. As consolation, she was one of 461 athletes to receive a Congressional Gold Medal many years later. Anita is also an avid horseback rider and teacher.

References

External links
 
 databaseOlympics
 

1951 births
Living people
American female field hockey players
Field hockey players at the 1984 Summer Olympics
Olympic bronze medalists for the United States in field hockey
Place of birth missing (living people)
Medalists at the 1984 Summer Olympics
Congressional Gold Medal recipients
21st-century American women